The Bundaberg Hummock, also referred to as The Hummock, is an extinct volcano remnant situated in the locality of Qunaba east of Bundaberg, Queensland, Australia. Its official (but rarely used) name is Sloping Hummock. The summit of the hill holds both a memorial to Bert Hinkler and the heritage listed Sir Anthony's Rest

History 

From the deck of HMS Norfolk, Lieutenant Matthew Flinders took a bearing on a small volcanic outcrop, five kilometres to the south of Mon Repos beach.  Flinders was surveying the waters between Great Sandy Island (Fraser Island) and the mainland.  He named the outcrop the Sloping Hummock during his 1799 visit.

In 1930, the Bundaberg branch of the  Royal Automobile Club of Queensland (RACQ) acquired the land at the top of the Hummock in order to create a park for motoring tourists to enjoy the views. The park was officially opened on 17 October 1931.

On 14 August 1937, the President of the RACQ unveiled a memorial to the Bundaberg-born aviator Bert Hinkler on the top of the Hummock.

Geography 
Qunaba is predominantly farming land, much of it used to grow sugarcane. It is mostly flat land with the exception of the Hummock which provides excellent views over the surrounding flat farmlands. The sides of the Hummock have attracted residential development to take advantage of the views. The fertility of the area is due to the volcanic soil from previous eruptions of the Hummock, which also left the local area scattered with volcanic rocks.

Heritage listing
The Hummock has been heritage listed as follows:
 Sir Anthony's Rest Street: Sir Anthony's Rest, a dry-stone rubble platform, constructed during the visit of the Governor of Queensland, Sir Anthony Musgrave, to Bundaberg in 1888

References

External links

Queensland Holiday
Australian Explorer Photos from the Hummock

Extinct volcanoes
Bundaberg
Bundaberg Region
Volcanoes of Queensland